Eucobresia nivalis is a species of air-breathing land snail, a terrestrial pulmonate gastropod mollusk in the family Vitrinidae, the glass snails.

Distribution
This species lives in the Alps and the Carpathian Mountains in the following countries:

 Czech Republic
 Poland
 Slovakia
 Austria
 Ukraine

References

External links
 "Species summary for Eucobresia nivalis". AnimalBase

Vitrinidae
Gastropods described in 1854
Taxa named by Charles Dumont de Sainte-Croix